The Helsinki International Film Festival – Love & Anarchy is a non-competitive film festival held since 1988 in Helsinki, Finland, yearly in September. The festival promotes the artistry of filmmaking, the inventive, visually stunning and controversial new films, revealing the promising talents of tomorrow. The festival was named after the 1973 Lina Wertmüller film Love and Anarchy.

In 2015 the festival attracted over 61,000 visitors.

References

External links 
Helsinki International Film Festival

Film festivals in Finland
Festivals in Helsinki
Autumn events in Finland